The Dwarsrivier mine is a large mine in the north-east of South Africa near Dwarsrivier in Limpopo. Dwarsrivier represents one of the largest chromium reserve in South Africa having estimated reserves of 55 million tonnes of ore grading 38.12% chromium. The 55 million tonnes of ore contains 21 million tonnes of chromium metal.

References 

Chromium mines in South Africa
Economy of Limpopo
Geography of Limpopo